Year 217 (CCXVII) was a common year starting on Wednesday (link will display the full calendar) of the Julian calendar. At the time, it was known as the Year of the Consulship of Praesens and Extricatus (or, less frequently, year 970 Ab urbe condita). The denomination 217 for this year has been used since the early medieval period, when the Anno Domini calendar era became the prevalent method in Europe for naming years.

Events

By place

Roman Empire 
 April 8 – Caracalla is assassinated by his soldiers near Edessa. Marcus Opellius Macrinus, head of the Praetorian Guard, declares himself Roman emperor. 
 Summer – Battle of Nisibis: A Roman army, under the command of Macrinus, is defeated in a three days' battle by the Parthians at Nisibis, in the province of Mesopotamia.
 King Artabanus V signs a peace treaty with Rome after he receives 200 million sesterces, for the rebuilding of towns destroyed during the war in Parthia.  
 Macrinus, of Mauritania, becomes the first equestrian Roman emperor. 
 Empress Julia, wife of Septimius Severus and mother of Caracalla and Geta, commits suicide. 
 The Colosseum is badly damaged by fire (lightning) which destroys the wooden upper levels of the amphitheater.

China 
 Battle of Ruxu: Warlord Cao Cao once again clashes with his rival Sun Quan in Yang Province.

By topic

Religion 
 December 20 – The papacy of Zephyrinus ends. Callixtus I is elected as the  sixteenth pope, but is opposed by the theologian Hippolytus who accuses him of laxity and of being a Modalist, one who denies any distinction between the three persons of the Trinity.
 Hippolytus begins his "pontificate" as antipope and sets up a breakaway church for Christian followers.

Sports 
According to a tradition noted by 19th-century historian Stephen Glover, the earliest recorded game of association football (soccer) took place in Derby, England as a celebration on Shrove Tuesday, the day before commencement of the Lent season on Ash Wednesday, and 47 days before Easter Sunday
</onlyinclude>

Births 
 Fu Xuan, Chinese historian and poet (d. 278)
 Hua He, Chinese official and historian (d. 278)
 Jia Chong, Chinese politician and general (d. 282)
 Wang Yuanji, Chinese empress dowager (d. 268)

Deaths 
 April 8 – Caracalla, Roman emperor (b. 188)
 December 20 – Zephyrinus, pope of Rome
 Chen Lin, Chinese official and politician
 Dong Xi (or Yuanshi), Chinese general 
 Julia Domna, Roman empress (b. 160)
 Lucius Valerius Datus, Roman prefect
 Ling Tong (or Gongji), Chinese general (b. 189)  
 Lu Su, Chinese general and politician (b. 172)
 Sima Lang, Chinese official and politician (b. 171)
 Wang Can, Chinese politician and poet (b. 177)
 Xu Gan, Chinese philosopher and poet (b. 171)

References